is a Japanese politician of Your Party, formerly of the Liberal Democratic Party, a member of the House of Councillors, formerly of the House of Representatives in the Diet (national legislature). A native of Tokyo and graduate of Waseda University, he was elected to the House of Representatives for the first time in 1999 after an unsuccessful run in 1996.

He ran in House of Councillors election in 2010 as a candidate of Your Party and won.

References

External links 

  

1966 births
Living people
People from Tokyo
Waseda University alumni
Members of the House of Representatives (Japan)
Members of the House of Councillors (Japan)
Liberal Democratic Party (Japan) politicians
Your Party politicians
21st-century Japanese politicians